Charrette Township is an inactive township in Warren County, in the U.S. state of Missouri.

Charrette Township takes its name from Charrette Creek.

References

Townships in Missouri
Townships in Warren County, Missouri